USS Wilkes may refer to:

, a torpedo boat which served around the turn of the 20th century
, a destroyer which served during World War I
, a destroyer which served during World War II

See also

 Charles Wilkes

United States Navy ship names